David Robbins is an American music composer. He is a brother of actor and director Tim Robbins. He has written many works for television and films, including the films Dead Man Walking and Bob Roberts.

References

External links

Living people
American television composers
American film score composers
American male film score composers
20th-century American composers
Georges Delerue Award winners
20th-century American male musicians
Year of birth missing (living people)